Patriot Sejdiu (born 5 May 2000) is a Kosovan professional footballer who plays as a right winger for Swedish club Malmö FF.

Club career

Malmö FF
On 8 January 2020, Sejdiu signed his first professional contract with Allsvenskan side Malmö FF after agreeing to a one-season deal and received squad number 36.

Loan at Dalkurd
On 30 January 2020, Sejdiu joined Superettan side Dalkurd, on a season-long loan. His debut with Dalkurd came on 16 June in a 0–0 away draw against Akropolis after coming on as a substitute at 74th minute in place of Arian Kabashi.

Return from loan
Sejdiu returned to Malmö at the beginning of the 2021 season, but without being able to play due to knee injury. On 20 November 2021, he was named as a Malmö substitute for the first time in a league match against Häcken. His debut with Malmö came on 26 February 2022 in the 2021–22 Svenska Cupen group stage against Ängelholm after coming on as a substitute at 84th minute in place of Veljko Birmančević.

International career
In January 2020, Sejdiu becomes part of Sweden U20 with which he made his debut in a unofficial friendly match against Anorthosis Famagusta U21 after being named in the starting line-up and scored his side's sixth goal during a 7–0 away deep win.

On 29 August 2020, Sejdiu received a call-up from Kosovo U21 for the 2021 UEFA European Under-21 Championship qualification match against England U21. His debut with Kosovo U21 came on 25 March 2022 in a 2023 UEFA European Under-21 Championship qualification match against Slovenia U21 after being named in the starting line-up.

Honours
Malmö FF
Svenska Cupen: 2021–22

References

External links

2000 births
Living people
Sportspeople from Pristina
Kosovan men's footballers
Kosovo youth international footballers
Kosovan expatriate footballers
Expatriate footballers in Sweden
Kosovan expatriate sportspeople in Sweden
Swedish men's footballers
Swedish people of Kosovan descent
Swedish people of Albanian descent
Allsvenskan players
Malmö FF players
Superettan players
Dalkurd FF players